This is a list of islands of Serbia. The best known Island is the Ada Ciganlija, which is a popular recreational area and tourist spot. Apart from Ada, Belgrade has total of 16 islands on the rivers, many still unused. Among them, the Great War Island at the confluence of Sava, stands out as an oasis of unshattered wildlife (especially birds). These areas, along with nearby Small War Island, are protected by the city's government as a nature preserve.

See also
List of islands in the Danube

References

External links
 

Serbia
Islands